William Anton Gittinger (March 28, 1888 – February 13, 1966), best known as William Steele, was an American actor of small roles in Westerns, particularly those of John Ford.

Biography
Although his screen credits and many records indicate a wide variety of names and spellings, Steele's own signatures on his military documents indicate that he was born William Anton Gittinger on March 28, 1888 (not 1889, as some sources have it) in San Antonio, Texas. Little is known of his life prior to his arrival in Los Angeles around 1910. As the film industry in Hollywood was just blossoming, and as he apparently had great experience with horses, Steele easily obtained work in quickie Westerns. He fought in Europe in World War I, then returned to Hollywood.  While he was extremely inconsistent in the names he used, he worked consistently in Westerns throughout the silent era and up until the 1950s. His final appearance was as the wounded posse member Nesby in Ford's The Searchers in 1956, his tenth film for Ford. He died ten years later, not quite 78 years old. He was survived by his wife Josephine, an actress. He is buried under his birth name at Fort Sam Houston National Cemetery in San Antonio, Texas.

Stage names
Billy Gettinger
Bill Gettinger
William Gettinger
William Gittenger
Bill Steele
Robert Steele
W.A. Steele
William A. Steele
William Steuer
William Steele

Partial filmography

 The Ring of Destiny (1915, Short) - The Cattle Rustler
 A Knight of the Range (1916) - Burk
 Blood Money (1917, Short) - Dan Beckham
 The Bad Man of Cheyenne (1917, Short) - The Sheriff
 Her Own People (1917) -Polsa Kar
 The Outlaw and the Lady (1917, Short) - The Sheriff
 Goin' Straight (1917, Short) - Sheriff Dan Bekham
 The Fighting Gringo (1917) - Jim
 Hair-Trigger Burke (1917, Short) - The Sheriff
 A 44-Calibre Mystery (1917, Short) - Deputy Sheriff Horton
 The Mysterious Outlaw (1917, Short) - Henry Martin
 The Golden Bullet (1917, Short) - Crazy Creek Sheriff
 The Wrong Man (1917, Short) - Larry Malone
 Six-Shooter Justice (1917, Short) - Mike Hernandez
 The Soul Herder (1917, Short) - Bill Young
 Cheyenne's Pal (1917, Short) - Cowboy
 The Texas Sphinx (1917, Short) - Dick Lonagan
 The Secret Man (1917) - The Foreman
 A Marked Man (1917) - Sheriff
 Bucking Broadway (1917) - Buck Hoover
 The Phantom Riders (1918) - Dave Bland
 The Misfit Wife (1920) - Duff Simpson
 The Stranger (1920) - Dr. Tyke
 The Avenging Arrow (1921) - Don Carlos Martinez
 The Wallop (1921) - Christopher Foy
 Riding with Death (1921) - Chick Dillon
 Pardon My Nerve! (1922) - Nebraska Jones
 The Fast Mail (1922) - Pierre La Fitte
 Bells of San Juan (1922) - Kid Rickard
 Single Handed (1923) - Windy Smith
 Dead Game (1923) - Sam Antone
 Don Quickshot of the Rio Grande (1923) - Bill Barton
 Shootin' for Love (1923) - Dan Hobson
 Hit and Run (1924) - The Gopher
 The Sunset Trail (1924) - Brand Williams
 The Last Man on Earth (1924) - Hattie's Father
 The Ridin' Kid from Powder River (1924) - 'Lightnin' Bill Smith
 The Hurricane Kid (1925) - Lafe Baxter
 The Saddle Hawk (1925) - Steve Kern
 Let 'er Buck (1925) - Kent Crosby
 Don Dare Devil (1925) - Benito Menocal
 The Sagebrush Lady (1925) - Sheriff Martin
 Ace of Spades (1925) - Jim Heath
 Two-Fisted Jones (1925) - Hank Gage
 Under Western Skies (1926) - Fleming
 A Six Shootin' Romance (1926) - Currier King
 The Flaming Frontier (1926) - Penfield
 The Fighting Peacemaker (1926) - Clell Danert
 The Wild Horse Stampede (1926) - Charlie Champion
 The Ridin' Rascal (1926)
 The Runaway Express (1926) - Blackie McPherson
 Rough and Ready (1927) - Morris Manning
 Loco Luck (1927) - Frank Lambert
 The Valley of Hell (1927) - James Brady
 Whispering Sage (1927) - Tom Kildare
 Range Courage (1927) - Tex Lucas
 Hoof Marks (1927) - Sam Trapp
 The Fearless Rider (1928) - Dr. Lucifer Blade
 The Call of the Heart (1928) - Dave Crenshaw
 Thunder Riders (1928) - Lem Dawson
 The Black Ace (1928)
 The Lone Star Ranger (1930) - First Deputy
 Doughboys (1930) - Lieutenant Randolph
 Flaming Guns (1932) - Rustler (uncredited)
 The California Trail (1933) - Pedro
 King of the Arena (1933) - (uncredited)
 Gordon of Ghost City (1933, Serial) - Bob (Ch. 11) (uncredited)
 Laughing Boy (1934) - Guide (uncredited)
 The Vanishing Shadow (1934, Serial) - Henchman (uncredited)
 The Red Rider (1934, Serial) - Townsman (uncredited)
 Rocky Rhodes (1934) - Cowhand (uncredited)
 When a Man Sees Red (1934) - Henchman Speck
 For the Service (1936) - Henchman (uncredited)
 Marie Antoinette (1938) - Footman (uncredited)
 The Westerner (1940) - Tex Cole (uncredited)
 The Outlaw (1943) - Deputy (uncredited)
 San Antonio (1945) - Roper (uncredited)
 Two Guys from Texas (1948) - Townsman (uncredited)
 She Wore a Yellow Ribbon (1949) - Officer (uncredited)
 Colt .45 (1950) - Henchman (uncredited)
 The Showdown (1950) - Terry
 Copper Canyon (1950) - Roper (uncredited)
 The Searchers (1956) - Nesby (uncredited) (final film role)

References

External links

1888 births
1966 deaths
American male film actors
American male silent film actors
Burials at Fort Sam Houston National Cemetery
Male Western (genre) film actors
20th-century American male actors